Eyvand-e Now (also known as Eyvand-e Soflá) is a village in Javersiyan Rural District, Qareh Chay District, Khondab County, Markazi Province, Iran. At the 2006 census, its population was 143, in 34 families.

References 

Populated places in Khondab County